Calixte is a surname and unisex given name of French-origin, from the Latin Callistus. 
People with the name include:

Surname
Démosthènes Pétrus Calixte, Haitian politician and military leader
Marc Calixte, Canadian gridiron football player
Orlando Calixte, Dominican baseball player
Widlin Calixte, Haitian footballer

Given name
Calixte Dakpogan, Beninese sculptor 
Calixte Delmas, French wrestler and rugby player
Calixte Duguay, Canadian artist
Joseph Arthur Calixte Éthier, Canadian politician
Calixte Ganongo, Congolese politician
Calixa Lavallée, Canadian-American composer best known for composing O Canada, the national anthem of Canada
Pierre-Calixte Neault, Canadian politician
Calixte "Charles" Payot, French ice hockey player
Calixte Savoie, Canadian businessman and politician
Henri Serrur, French painter who often signed his paintings Calixte
Calixte Zagré, Burkinabè football manager and coach

Papal name
Pope Callixtus I, 217-222
Pope Callixtus II, 1119-1124
Pope Callixtus III, 1455-1458
Antipope Callixtus III, 1168-1178

Place name
Calixa-Lavallée, Quebec, suburb of Montreal in Quebec, Canada
Saint-Calixte, Quebec, municipality and town in the Lanaudière region of Quebec, Canada

Other
Calixa-Lavallée Award, music award granted by the Saint-Jean-Baptiste Society to Québécois musicians

See also
Callistus

Masculine given names
Feminine given names
French feminine given names
French masculine given names
French unisex given names
Surnames of French origin